The 2000 NAPA Auto Parts 500 was a NASCAR Winston Cup Series race held on April 30, 2000, at California Speedway in Fontana, California. Contested over 250 laps on the  speedway, it was the 10th race of the 2000 NASCAR Winston Cup Series season. Jeremy Mayfield of Penske-Kranefuss Racing won the race.

Background
The track's turns are banked from fourteen degrees, while the front stretch, the location of the finish line, is banked at eleven degrees. Unlike the front stretch, the back straightaway is banked at three degrees.

Top 10 results

References

NAPA Auto Parts 500
NAPA Auto Parts 500
NASCAR races at Auto Club Speedway